Altamirano is a town in Brandsen Partido in Buenos Aires Province, Argentina.

Rail disaster

On 1 February 1964, it was the site of a head-on train collision in which 70 people were killed.

Population 
According to the 2001 census, carried out by the National Institute of Statistics and Census of Argentina (INDEC), the population count was 258. This represents a loss of 3.7% over 268 in 1991 (the previous census).

External links 

 Coord and NASA, Google images

Populated places in Buenos Aires Province